Ninnekah is a town in Grady County, Oklahoma, United States. The population was 1,002 at the 2010 census.

History
A post office was established at Ninnekah, Indian Territory on July 28, 1892.  The name is from the Choctaw word, ninek, meaning "night" or "darkness."

At the time of its founding, Ninnekah was located in Pickens County, Chickasaw Nation.

Geography
Ninnekah is located in west-central Grady County at  (34.956883, -97.935011). It is bordered to the north by the city of Chickasha, the county seat. U.S. Route 81 passes through the town, leading north  into Chickasha and south  to Duncan. U.S. Route 277 splits west from US 81 in Ninnekah and leads  to Cement.

Demographics as of 2020 
As of the 2020 Census, there was a total population of 1,150 people. There was a population density of 113 people per square mile, spread over 10.2 miles. Of those 1,150 people, the median age was 42.2 years, with 23% of the town's population under the age of 18, 61% between the ages of 18 and 64, and 16% of the population over the age of 65. There were a total of 387 households, with in an average of 3 people per household.

56% of the town's population is male, with 44% of the population female. The racial makeup of the town was 83% White, less than 1% African American, 6% Native American, 5% mixed race, and 6% Hispanic.

The average income per capita of Ninnekah was $27,086, which is lower than the state average, and the median household income was $59,063, 10% higher than the remainder of the state. Only 5.9% of the population of the town lives under the poverty line, which is far less than the rest of the state.

67% of the population of the town is identified as currently married, but only 4.4% of women between the ages of 15 and 50 gave birth during that year, less than the average in the Oklahoma City Metro Area.

92.8% of the Ninnekah population has received a high school degree, which is 4.2 percentage points higher than the rest of the state. Although Ninnekah has a lower-than-average percentage of the population having received college degrees, only 13.6% of the town's population has received a college degree compared to the state average of 26.2%.

7.1% of the town's population were veterans.

Demographics as of 2000

As of the census of 2000, there were 994 people, 400 households, and 304 families residing in the town. There were 440 housing units at an average density of 43.3 per square mile (16.7/km2). The racial makeup of the town was 89.44% White, 0.60% African American, 3.82% Native American, 0.40% Asian, 0.50% from other races, and 5.23% from two or more races. Hispanic or Latino of any race were 1.91% of the population.

There were 400 households, out of which 31.0% had children under the age of 18 living with them, 62.0% were married couples living together, 10.3% had a female householder with no husband present, and 24.0% were non-families. 20.8% of all households were made up of individuals, and 7.3% had someone living alone who was 65 years of age or older. The average household size was 2.49 and the average family size was 2.85.

In the town, the population was spread out, with 23.5% under the age of 18, 9.2% from 18 to 24, 27.7% from 25 to 44, 28.7% from 45 to 64, and 11.0% who were 65 years of age or older. The median age was 39 years. For every 100 females, there were 98.8 males. For every 100 females age 18 and over, there were 94.9 males.

The median income for a household in the town was $31,181, and the median income for a family was $37,656. Males had a median income of $29,659 versus $21,328 for females. The per capita income for the town was $16,434. About 14.1% of families and 19.5% of the population were below the poverty line, including 30.3% of those under age 18 and 13.5% of those age 65 or over.

References

Towns in Grady County, Oklahoma
Towns in Oklahoma
Populated places established in 1892